Zawisze  is a village in the administrative district of Gmina Skąpe, within Świebodzin County, Lubusz Voivodeship, in western Poland.

The village has a population of 225.

References

Zawisze